HMS Attacker (D02) was an American-built escort carrier that served with the Royal Navy during the Second World War.

Attacker served throughout the war, first as a convoy escort in the Battle of the Atlantic. After further conversion by the Royal Navy in October 1943, into an assault carrier, the ship was active in the Mediterranean, and later the war in the Pacific. In late August 1945, Attacker witnessed the Japanese surrender of Penang, in Malaya, as part of Operation Jurist.

Construction
The merchantman Steel Artisan was laid down on 17 April 1941, under a Maritime Commission contract, MC hull 171, by Western Pipe and Steel Company of San Francisco. She was renamed Barnes (AVG-7) on 3 September 1941, and launched on 27 September 1941. Barnes was towed to the Mare Island Navy Yard on 10 October 1941, for conversion to an escort carrier. On 1 March 1942, she was assigned to be transferred to the British under Lend-Lease. She was redesignated BACV-7 on 20 August 1942. Barnes was commissioned into the US Navy on 30 September 1942, and decommissioned and transferred to the Royal Navy on the same day. On 7 October 1942, she was commissioned into the Royal Navy as under the command of Captain Shirley-Rollison, RN.

Design and description
Attacker was the lead ship in what became the Royal Navy's  of 11 ships; one of 38 escort carriers built in the United States for the Royal Navy during the Second World War. The Western Pipe & Steel shipyards built three other ships in the class. Once completed she was supplied under the terms of Lend-Lease agreement to the Royal Navy. There was a ships complement of 646 men, who lived in crew accommodation that was significantly different from the arrangements that were normal for the Royal Navy at the time. The separate messes no longer had to prepare their own food, as everything was cooked in the galley and served cafeteria style in a central dining area. They were also equipped with a modern laundry and a barber shop. The traditional hammocks were replaced by three-tier bunk-beds, 18 to a cabin, which were hinged and could be tied up to provide extra space when not in use.

She displaced  at full load.

She had the capacity for up to 24 aircraft which could be a mixture of anti-submarine and fighter aircraft; the British Hawker Sea Hurricane and Supermarine Seafire naval fighters, Fairey Swordfish torpedo bomber or the American-supplied Grumman Martlet and Vought F4U Corsair fighters or Grumman Avenger torpedo bomber could be carried. The exact composition of the embarked squadrons depended upon the mission. Some squadrons were composite squadrons for convoy defence and would be equipped with both anti-submarine and fighter aircraft, while other squadrons working in a strike carrier role would only be equipped with fighter aircraft. Aircraft facilities were a small combined bridge–flight control on the starboard side and above the  flight deck, two aircraft lifts , and nine arrestor wires. Aircraft could be housed in the   hangar below the flight deck.

The ships armament concentrated on anti-aircraft (AA) defence and comprised two QF  MK V dual purpose guns in single mounts, eight  Bofors guns in twin mounts and ten  Oerlikon cannons in single and eight in twin mounts.

Attacker was designed to accompany other ships forming the escort for convoys. The anti-submarine aircraft employed were initially the Fairey Swordfish and later the Grumman Avenger, which could be armed with torpedoes, depth charges,  bombs or RP-3 rocket projectiles. As well as carrying out their own attacks on U-Boats, these aircraft identified their locations for the convoy's escorts to mount an attack. Typically anti-submarine patrols would be flown between dawn and dusk. One aircraft would fly about  ahead of the convoy, while another patrolled astern. Patrols would last between two and three hours, using both radar and visual observation in their search for U-Boats.
Attacker also had a secondary role, providing oil and provisions for her accompanying destroyers. This could be a lengthy process and was done on the move. It took 40 minutes from firing a line across to the destroyer to start pumping oil, while it took another two hours to pump 98 tons of oil and a further 35 minutes to disconnect the hose pipe and secure the equipment.

Service history
On 12 November 1942, Attacker started her flying and sea trials off San Francisco. She had embarked four Swordfish I torpedo bombers of 838 squadron from Naval Air Station Alameda.

After completion of her trials, and being qualified for duty, she set sail for Balboa, on 12 December, with 838 squadron. She passed through the Panama Canal, and arrived at Cristobal, on 22 December. She later sailed for NAS Quonset Point, where she disembarked 838 squadron, 1 January 1943. Attacker was in Chesapeake Bay, during January, for a period of Deck Landing Training (DLT) with Martlets from 882 squadron, 896 squadron, and 898 squadron and Swordfish from 838 and 840 squadrons.

On 2 March 1943, Attacker set sail for Curacao, with 838 squadron and six Swordfish from 840 squadron, for escort duty with Convoy CU 1. Attackers first active service in the Atlantic was to provided anti submarine cover during her crossing from the United States to Great Britain. She set sail from Curacao, on 20 March 1943, arriving in Clyde, on 1 April 1943, and Liverpool the following day.

On 4 April 1943, in Liverpool, she started two months of modification during which radar was fitted and US  guns were changed for British ones.

Mediterranean

Operation Avalanche
Attacker transferred to the Mediterranean theatre reaching Malta, 7 September 1943.

From 9–12 September, the five carriers launched a total of 713 sorties, with Attacker sending out 132. Seventy-five patrol sorties were carried out by 879 squadron, while 57 were flown by 886 squadron, with no aircraft lost to enemy action.

Attacker joined Convoy MK 24, along with Hunter and Stalker, to escort it from Gibraltar to Clyde, from 17 September to 6 October 1943. She then sailed for Rosyth Naval Dockyard, on 7 October, for conversion to an assault carrier, arriving 10 October.

Conversion

With her upgrades finished in December 1943, Attacker again embarked Seafires of 879 and 886 squadrons on 29 December, for training from January–February 1944, in her new role of providing air support for major military landings until shore based air strips became operational. Operation Avalanche had proven a need for this strategy. She returned to Liverpool, on 9 February, for further repairs.

Attacker, along with Hunter and Stalker, were ordered to Scapa Flow, arriving on 5 May 1944, for participation in Operation Hoops scheduled for 8 May.

On 14 May, the three ships set out for the Mediterranean as additional escorts for the Convoy KMS 51, which had departed Liverpool, the previous day. Attacker detached from the convoy on 19 May, and put into Gibraltar, 24 May. On 2 June, she moved from her berth on the North Mole to the inside of the Detached Mole, where on the night of 4 June, while silhouetted behind the mole, an enemy submarine launched a torpedo at her. The torpedo detonated on the outside of the mole which caused to serious damage to Attacker. On June 6, she and Hunter sailed for Mers El Kébir, providing air cover for Convoy KMS 52.

Operation Dragoon

During June 1944, Attacker provided air cover for several convoys travelling in the Western Mediterranean.

Attacker joined Carrier Force TF88.1 for Operation Dragoon. The force exercised off Malta, between 2 and 12 August, with the actual invasion starting in the early hours of 15 August. On 19 August, TF88.1 withdrew to Maddalena, Sardinia, for refueling and rearming. They took up position south of Marseilles, on 21 August, until 23 August, when they returned to Maddalena, again to refuel and rearm. TF88.1 was released on 28 August. She left Maddalena, for Alexandria, on 29 August.

Operations Outing I, Outing II, Manna
Attacker set sail on 14 September 1944, to participate in Operation Outing I, an operation designed to delay German troop movements in the Dodecanese Islands. She arrived 15 September, and relieved Hunter. She returned to Alexandria, on 20 September, to resupply, and returned to the Dodecanese Islands, on 27 September, for Operation Outing II. She again returned to Alexandria, 5 October, for further refuel and rearm. Hunter was again relieved by Attacker in the eastern Aegean Sea, on 11 October, for Operation Manna. Returning 30 October, to Alexandria.

Attacker, along with Hunter and Stalker, set sail for the United Kingdom, on 31 October 1944, having been picked for service with the East Indies Fleet. After a brief stopover at Malta, on 3 November, the three carriers reached Plymouth, 10 November, for a short period of defect rectifications at the Devonport Naval Dockyard and the opportunity for their crews to go on home leave. On 29 November, the three set out for the Mediterranean, to undergo refits in transit to the Pacific. They arrived in Gibraltar, on 3 December, where Stalker was refit with Hunter proceeding to Malta, and Attacker proceeding to Taranto, Italy, their refits.

After completing refit trials Attacker set sail on 1 April 1945, for Alexandria. She embarked 879 squadron on 14 April, then proceeded through the Suez Canal, to Aden, and then Ceylon, arriving 29 April.

Pacific War
Attacker was assigned to 21 ACS, but due to defects discovered during her transit to the Pacific Theater, she was deemed unfit for operation. During May, and part of June, Attacker and Hunter were assigned to aircraft transport duties between India and South Africa to Ceylon.

Operation Carson
After a couple of training periods during June and July with 879 squadron she was allocated to Task Force 61 to participate in Operation Carson, which was to be a series of attacks on Japanese shipping and airfields in the Penang and Medan areas of Sumatra. Task Force 61 was order to hold west of 90 degrees east latitude on 11 August, to wait for further orders. They were ordered to return to Trincomalee, arriving 15 August, where they received the Station General Message, "SUSPEND OFFENSIVE OPERATIONS AGAINST JAPANESE FORCES." Attacker was in harbour at Trincomalee, to celebrate V-J Day while waiting on new orders. She had already been allocated to Operation Zipper, the planned invasion of Singapore, which was scheduled for September 1945. With the end of hostilities, they were a reoccupying force instead of an invading force.

Operations Jurist and Tiderace
In late August 1945, Attacker witnessed the Japanese surrender of Penang, in Malaya, as part of Operation Jurist.

In September 1945, Attacker was present at Singapore, as part of Operation Tiderace, sailing immediately afterwards for Clyde, to de-store and enter reserve.

FAA squadrons

Honours
Attacker was awarded Royal Navy honours for her contribution to the Battle of the Atlantic (1943–44), for support to the Salerno landings (1943), and to the South France and Aegean campaigns in 1944. The vessel left British waters in December 1945, being formally received back into United States’ custody at the Norfolk Navy Yard, Norfolk, Virginia, on 5 January 1946, and struck from naval service on 26 February 1946.

Merchant service

In February 1947, the ship was sold into merchant service to National Bulk Carriers of New York, who in preparation for conversion to a cargo ship, arranged for the removal of the vessel's flight deck and other wartime fittings. The work eventually stopped and the vessel was offered for re-sale. In 1950, it was bought by the Vlasov Group and placed under the nominal ownership of Vlasov's American subsidiary, Navcot Corporation.  Renamed Castel Forte, the ship remained idle whilst suitable employment could be found.

In 1957, Vlasov secured a charter from the Australian government for Castel Forte to carry British migrants to Australia. During the conversion to a passenger liner the ship was renamed Fairsky and was operated by Vlasov's Italian managed company, Sitmar Line. On completion of the refurbishment in June 1958, the "new-look" vessel began a long career as a migrant-carrying ship,  which was to last until 1974, with the final migrant voyage from Southampton to Auckland. On 23 June 1977, while operating as a cruise ship, Fairsky hit a submerged wreck and was beached to prevent sinking. The damage was temporarily patched and the ship refloated six days later. When the full extent of the damage became known, Sitmar decided against permanent repairs and they offered the vessel for sale.

Having been reprieved from going straight to the breakers, in 1978, work began to convert the vessel to a static floating hotel and casino named Philippine Tourist.  However, the ship was badly damaged by fire on 3 November 1979, and subsequently scrapped in Hong Kong, the hulk having arrived there under tow on 24 May 1980.

References

Bibliography

External links

 

Bogue-class escort carriers
Attacker-class escort carriers
World War II aircraft carriers of the United Kingdom
Type C3-S-A1 ships of the Royal Navy
Ships built in San Francisco
1941 ships